Nidularium longiflorum is a plant species in the genus Nidularium. This species is endemic to Brazil.

References

longiflorum
Flora of Brazil